The Civil Services of Tamil Nadu (known simply as the Civil Services) refer to the civil service and the permanent bureaucracy of the Government of Tamil Nadu.

Authority 
 Government of Tamil Nadu
 Tamil Nadu Public Service Commission
 Department of Personnel and Administrative Reforms (Tamil Nadu)

Recruitment 
Recruitment to the Tamil Nadu Civil Services two type is done:
 Direct Recruitment through a competitive examination called the "TNPSC Group 1 to 8 Exam", organized by the Tamil Nadu Public Service Commission (TNPSC). 
 Recruitment by Transfer from exiting Service

Employment by Agency
 Department of Adi Dravidar and Tribal Welfare (Tamil Nadu) 
 Department of Agriculture (Tamil Nadu)
 Department of Animal Husbandry, Dairying and Fisheries (Tamil Nadu)
 Department of Backward Classes, Most Backward Classes and Minorities Welfare (Tamil Nadu)
 Department of Co-operation, Food and Consumer Protection (Tamil Nadu)
 Department of Commercial Taxes and Registration (Tamil Nadu)
 Department of Energy (Tamil Nadu)
 Department of Environment and Forests (Tamil Nadu)
 Department of Finance (Tamil Nadu)
 Department of Handlooms, Handicrafts, Textiles and Khadi (Tamil Nadu)
 Department of Health and Family Welfare (Tamil Nadu)
 Department of Higher Education (Tamil Nadu)
 Department of Highways and Minor Ports (Tamil Nadu)
 Department of Home, Prohibition and Excise (Tamil Nadu)
 Department of Housing and Urban Development (Tamil Nadu)
 Department of Industries (Tamil Nadu)
 Department of Information Technology (Tamil Nadu)
 Department of Labour and Employment (Tamil Nadu)
 Department of Law (Tamil Nadu)
 Department of Legislative Assembly (Tamil Nadu)
 Department of Municipal Administration and Water Supply (Tamil Nadu)
 Department of Micro, Small and Medium Enterprises (Tamil Nadu) (formerly Small Industries Department )
 Department of Personnel and Administrative Reforms (Tamil Nadu)
 Department of Planning, Development and Special Initiatives (Tamil Nadu)
 Department of Public (Tamil Nadu)
 Department of Public Works (Tamil Nadu)
 Department of Revenue (Tamil Nadu)
 Department of Rural Development and Panchayat Raj (Tamil Nadu)
 Department of School Education (Tamil Nadu)
 Department of Social Reforms (Tamil Nadu)
 Department of Social Welfare and Nutritious Meal Programme (Tamil Nadu)
 Department of Special Programme Implementation (Tamil Nadu)
 Department of Tourism and Culture (Tamil Nadu)
 Department of Tamil Development, Religious Endowments and Information (Tamil Nadu)
 Department of Transport (Tamil Nadu)
 Department of Youth Welfare and Sports Development (Tamil Nadu)
 Department of Welfare of Differently Abled Persons (Tamil Nadu)

See also 
 Tamil Nadu Public Service Commission
 Department of Personnel and Administrative Reforms (Tamil Nadu)
 Government of Tamil Nadu
 Civil Services of India
 Union Public Service Commission

References

External links

  www.tnpsc.gov.in/ Tamil Nadu Public Service Commission
 www.tn.gov.in/departments/par.html Tamil Nadu Personnel and Administrative Reforms Department
 www.tn.gov.in Government of Tamil Nadu

Others links

State civil services of India
Government of Tamil Nadu